Albert Bormann (2 September 19028 April 1989) was a German National Socialist Motor Corps (NSKK) officer, who rose to the rank of Gruppenführer (Generalleutnant) during World War II. Bormann served as an adjutant to Adolf Hitler, and was the younger brother of Martin Bormann.

Early life and education
Bormann was born on 2 September 1902 in Wegeleben (now in Saxony-Anhalt) in the Kingdom of Prussia in the German Empire. He was the son of Theodor Bormann (1862–1903), a post office employee, and his second wife, Antonie Bernhardine Mennong. The family was Lutheran. He had two half-siblings (Else and Walter Bormann) from his father's earlier marriage to Louise Grobler, who died in 1898. Antonie Bormann gave birth to three sons, one of whom died in infancy. Albert and his older brother Martin (1900–1945) survived to adulthood. Theodor died when Bormann was one, and his mother soon remarried.

Nazi career
In April 1931, Martin Bormann gained his brother a job with the Nazi Party Relief Fund in Munich. By October 1931, Bormann was assigned to Kanzlei des Führers (Hitler's Chancellery) of the National Socialist German Workers' Party (NSDAP). It was responsible for the Nazi Party and associated organizations and their dealings directly with Adolf Hitler. Bormann was different from his older brother, Martin. He was tall, cultured and "avoided the limelight". Bormann believed he was serving the greater good and did not use his position for personal gain. He became friends with SS-Obergruppenführer Philipp Bouhler, the chief of Hitler's Chancellery (Der Chef der Kanzlei des Führers der NSDAP).

Hitler was fond of Bormann and found him to be trustworthy. In 1938, Bormann was assigned to a small group of adjutants who were not subordinate to Martin Bormann. The relationship between Martin and Albert became so caustic that Martin referred to him not even by name but as "the man who holds the Führer's coat".

Further in 1938, Bormann became Chief of Main office I: Persönliche Angelegenheiten des Führers (Personal Affairs of the Führer) of the Kanzlei des Führers. In that job, Bormann handled much of Hitler's routine correspondence. Before being chosen as a private secretary for Hitler, Traudl Junge worked for Bormann in that office after she came to Berlin.

On 20 April 1945, during the Battle of Berlin, Bormann, Admiral Karl-Jesko von Puttkamer, Theodor Morell, Hugo Blaschke, secretaries Johanna Wolf, Christa Schroeder, and several others were ordered by Hitler to leave Berlin by aircraft for the Obersalzberg. The group flew out of Berlin on different flights by aircraft of the Fliegerstaffel des Führers over the following three days. Bormann stayed with his family at the Hotel Post in Hintersee, a couple of miles from Berchtesgaden. Because he was Martin's brother, he thought it was safer for his family not to stay there too long. In late May 1945, a US Army intelligence officer arrived at the hotel looking for Albert Bormann. By then, Bormann was gone, but Schroeder was still there and taken away for questioning on 28 May.

Post-war
After the end of World War II in Europe, Bormann went by the name Roth. He worked on a farm until April 1949, when he was arrested. He was sentenced by a Munich de-nazification court to six months of hard labor, being released in October 1949. Bormann disliked his brother Martin to the point where he did not even wish to discuss him in interviews after the war. Further, Bormann refused to write his memoirs. In April 1989, Bormann died while living in Munich.

Awards and decorations
 Golden Party Badge
 Nazi Party Long Service Award in Bronze and Silver

In fiction
 The Bormann Brief by Clive Egleton

See also

 List of Nazi Party leaders and officials

References

Citations

Bibliography
 
 
 
 
 

1902 births
1989 deaths
Adjutants of Adolf Hitler
Members of the Reichstag of Nazi Germany
National Socialist Motor Corps members
Martin Bormann